Count Gustaf Mauritz Armfelt (tr, ; 31 March 1757 – 19 August 1814) was a Finnish-Swedish-Russian courtier and diplomat. In Finland, he is considered one of the greatest Finnish statesmen.  His advice to Russia's Tsar Alexander I was of utmost importance for securing the autonomy of the Grand Duchy of Finland.

Career 
Born in Tarvasjoki, Finland, he was the great grandson of Charles XII of Sweden's general, Carl Gustaf Armfeldt.

In 1774, Armfelt became an ensign in the guards, but his frivolous behavior involving a duel provoked the displeasure of Gustav III of Sweden. As a result, he thought it prudent to go abroad 1778. Subsequently, however, in 1780, Armfelt met the king again at Spa in the Austrian Netherlands and completely won over the previously disgruntled monarch with his natural amiability, intelligence and social gifts. Henceforth, his fortune was made. At first, he was given the position of maître des plaisirs in the Swedish court, but it wasn't long before more serious affairs were entrusted to him. He took part in negotiations with Catherine II of Russia in 1783, and, during the Russo-Swedish War (1788–1790), he was one of the king's most trusted and active counsellors.

He displayed great valour in the field during this time. In 1788, when the Danes unexpectedly invaded Sweden and threatened Gothenburg, Armfelt organized the Dalecarlian levies under the king's direction and led them to victory. He remained absolutely faithful to King Gustav when nearly the whole of the Swedish nobility fell away from him. Armfelt distinguished himself in the later phases of the Russo-Swedish War, eventually becoming the Swedish plenipotentiary who negotiated the war's demise with the Treaty of Värälä in August 1790. Armfelt had been seriously wounded in the battle of Savitaipale in June 1790. During the reign of Gustav III, his influence was paramount in Sweden, though Armfelt protested against his master's headstrong championship of the Bourbons.

Diplomacy 
On his deathbed in 1792, King Gustav III committed the care of his infant son to Armfelt and appointed him to the Privy Council, which was to advise the new regent, the king's younger brother, Charles. Armfelt was also appointed as the Governor of Stockholm, but the new regent was staunchly anti-Gustavian and sent Armfelt to serve as the Swedish ambassador to Naples in order to get rid of him.

From Naples, Armfelt began secret communications with Catherine II, arguing that she should bring about by means of a military intervention a change in the Swedish government in favour of the Gustavians. The Armfelt Conspiracy, though, was discovered by spies for the regent, who immediately sent a Swedish man-of-war to Naples to seize him. With the assistance of the exiled British Queen Caroline, he was just barely able to escape. He fled to Russia, where he was interned at Kaluga 1794–1797. At home, he was condemned to death as a traitor and his property confiscated. His mistress, Magdalena Rudenschöld, was judged for complicity and pilloried on the Riddarhus Square before being imprisoned for two years in Stockholm.

Military service 
When Gustav IV of Sweden attained his majority, Armfelt was completely rehabilitated and sent as Swedish ambassador to Vienna in 1802, but was obliged to quit the post two years later for sharply attacking the Austrian government's attitude towards Napoleon Bonaparte.
From 1805 to 1807, he was the commander-in-chief of the Swedish forces in Pomerania, where he displayed great ability and stopped the conquest of the duchy for as long as possible; the Great Sortie of Stralsund was particularly successful. On his return home, he was appointed commander-in-chief of the Norwegian frontier, where he was stifled in his duties by the constant flow of ordres, contre-ordres et désordres from his master.

In Russian service 

Armfelt was firmly opposed to the revolutionaries who overthrew Gustav IV and exiled his family in the Coup of 1809. He was the most courageous of the deposed king's supporters and resolved afterwards to retire to Finland, which had been ceded to Russia. Appointed to high offices in the Swedish government, his departure was delayed on purpose until his enemies could gather and declare a decree expelling Armfelt as a conspirator in 1811. On 31 March, he visited Russia's ambassador in Stockholm and gave him an oath of allegiance. The following day, he was deported from Sweden.

Armfelt's position greatly improved in Russia. After deposing Speransky he exercised almost as much influence over Emperor Alexander I as Czartoryski. He contributed more than anyone else to Finnish independence with his plan to turn the Grand Duchy of Finland into an autonomous state within the Russian Empire. He also won over Alexander to the idea of uniting Norway with Sweden.

Armfelt, who had been Chancellor of the Royal Academy of Turku from 1791 to 1792, was made Chancellor of the new Imperial Academy of Turku in 1812. He held the position for two years. In 1812, the grateful Emperor raised him to the rank of count. He served as the Minister State Secretary of Finland, the Grand Duchy's highest representative, in St Petersburg 1812–14. He was also briefly Governor-General of Finland in 1813.

He died at Tsarskoe Selo near Saint Petersburg on 19 August 1814.

Legacy 
Together with Göran Magnus Sprengtporten, Armfelt is regarded as one of the fathers of Finnish independence. Because of his unpopularity among the anti-Gustavian Swedish nobility and the fact that he "turned Russian", Armfelt has been a rather-mysterious and generally-unknown character in Swedish history.

Ignorance of Armfelt and his accomplishments persisted for well over a century in Sweden and only recently has a more nuanced, positive approach to Armfelt emerged there. In Finland, he has always been highly regarded as a great patriot and statesman.

Because Armfelt chose to remain loyal to Finland and its people, rather than its former ruler, he was labeled as a traitor in Sweden and sentenced to death for treason. The Swedish people could not accept at the time the loss of Finland, which had been part of the realm for over 600 years. Their anguish was exacerbated by the fact that the province had been lost to Sweden's archenemy, Russia. Armfelt's death sentence, however, had no actual meaning outside of Sweden as there was never a realistic Swedish attempt launched to recapture Finland. Politicians threatened action mainly to gain favour among the nobles and populace. Already, in 1812, Sweden allied with Russia, and the sentence was annulled.

Family
In 1785, Armfelt married Countess Hedvig Ulrika De la Gardie (1761–1832), daughter of Count Carl Julius De la Gardie and Countess Magdalena Christina Stenbock.

They had the following eight children:
 Maria Magdalena Catharina Augusta Armfelt, (1786–1845), countess
 Gustaf Fredrik Armfelt, (1788–1789).
 Carl Armfelt, born and died 1788.
 Magnus Armfelt, born and died 1788.
 Gustaf Magnus Armfelt, (1792–1856), major-general, count
 Alexander Armfelt, (1794–1876), captain, Finnish minister secretary of state, privy councillor, count
 Constantin Armfelt, (1796–1797).
 Carl Magnus Wilhelm Armfelt, (1797–1878).

From the affair with the actress Mademoiselle L'Eclair in Paris, Armfelt had an illegitimate son, Maurice L'Eclair (1780–1841).
From the affair with Princess Wilhelmine, Duchess of Sagan, Armfelt had an illegitimate daughter, Adelaide Gustava Aspasie (Vava) Armfelt (1801–1881).
Maurice was knighted in 1816 in Sweden as Mauritz Clairfelt and became a general; Vava was adopted in 1812 into the Armfelt family.

See also
 Georg Magnus Sprengtporten

References

Attribution:

Further reading

External links
 

|-

1757 births
1814 deaths
People from Tarvasjoki
Swedish generals
18th-century Swedish nobility
Members of the Swedish Academy
Politicians of the Russian Empire
Members of the State Council (Russian Empire)
Finland under Swedish rule
Imperial Russian Army generals
Governors of the Grand Duchy of Finland
18th-century Swedish military personnel
19th-century Swedish politicians
18th-century Finnish military personnel
People convicted of treason against Sweden
People sentenced to death in absentia
Swedish military commanders of the Napoleonic Wars
People of the Russo-Swedish War (1788–1790)
Ambassadors of Sweden to Italy
Gustavian era people
Finnish people from the Russian Empire
Court of Gustav III